Smoother may refer to:

 Kernel smoother, a statistical technique
 Smoother (band), a Canadian rock band
 , a robotized manual transmission developed by Isuzu Motors Ltd. of Japan

See also
 Asphyxia (smother)